Josef Kratochvíl is a Czech civil servant and current President of the Industrial Property Office of the Czech Republic. On December 12, 2018, he was elected Chairman of the Administrative Council of the European Patent Organisation, a position he took over on January 1, 2019 for a three-year term.

References

Year of birth missing (living people)
Place of birth missing (living people)
Living people
European Patent Organisation people
Czech civil servants
21st-century civil servants